Changshou Lake or Shizitan Reservoir in Changshou District, Chongqing, China. In the purpose of generating electric power, four hydraulic power stations were built after the dam construction had been completed in the 1950s. Since then a state farm was set up for fishery and horticulture as well as animal husbandry. Its surface area is 60 km2 with an irrigation area amounting to 248 km2. There are many islands within the lake, good for tourism.

See also
Changshouhu railway station, named after the lake

References 

Bodies of water of Chongqing
Changshou